The 1972 Rothmans F5000 European Championship  was a motor racing series for Formula 5000 cars. The series was organized in the United Kingdom by the British Racing and Sports Car Club but also included rounds in Belgium and Ireland. It was the fourth European Formula 5000 Championship, and the second to be contested under the Rothmans F5000 European Championship name. The championship was won by Gijs van Lennep, driving a Surtees TS11 and a McLaren M18.

Calendar

The championship was contested over fourteen rounds.

Points system
Championship points were awarded on a 9-6-4-3-2-1 basis for the first six places at each of the first thirteen rounds and on an 18-12-10-8-6-4-2 basis for the first six places at the final round.

Championship standings

References

European Formula 5000 Championship seasons
Rothmans